Simonas Galdikas (born 3 January 1987) is a Lithuanian former professional basketball player who last played for BC Gargždai-SC of the Lithuanian National Basketball League.

Playing career
Galdikas joined Neptūnas Klaipėda in 2009, after showing good performance in Lithuania's second strongest basketball league – NKL playing for Nafta-Uni-Laivitė Klaipėda scoring 9.2 points and 5.6 rebounds in his last season at the team. While playing for the latter, he was working as a security guard in a shopping mall.

On 1 August 2016, Galdikas signed with Lietkabelis Panevėžys.

On 22 August 2017, Galdikas signed with Neptūnas Klaipėda for a two-year contract. During the 2020-21 season he averaged 6.4 points and 3.4 rebounds per game. On 8 September 2021, Galdikas signed with BC Gargždai-SC of the Lithuanian National Basketball League.

Euroleague career statistics

|-
| style="text-align:left;"| 2014–15
| style="text-align:left;"| Neptūnas
| 10 || 9 || 19.2 || .632 || .000 || .750 || 4.7 || .9 || .8 || .3 || 6.0 || 7.8
|- class="sortbottom"
| colspan=2 style="text-align:center;"| Career
| 10 || 9 || 19.2 || .632 || .000 || .750 || 4.7 || .9 || .8 || .3 || 6.0 || 7.8

References

External links
 Simas Galdikas at LKL website

1987 births
Living people
Centers (basketball)
Lithuanian men's basketball players
BC Neptūnas players
Power forwards (basketball)
Basketball players from Klaipėda
BC Lietkabelis players